Damask is a reversible patterned fabric of silk, wool, linen, cotton, or synthetic fibers, with a pattern formed by weaving. Damasks are woven with one warp yarn and one weft yarn, usually with the pattern in warp-faced satin weave and the ground in weft-faced or sateen weave. Twill damasks include a twill-woven ground or pattern.

History

The production of damask was one of the five basic weaving techniques—the others being tabby, twill, lampas, and tapestry—of the Byzantine and Middle Eastern weaving centres of the early Middle Ages. Used in daily nomadic life this form of weaving was used generally as a female occupation, such as carpet-making. Women would collect the raw material from pasture animals and dyes from local flora such as berries, insects, or grasses. Each woman would create a specialized pattern sequence and use of color that was customary to her ethnic group and even herself. These techniques would often be handed down from mother to daughter as well.

In China, drawlooms with a large number of heddles were developed to weave damasks with very complicated patterns. The Chinese may have produced damasks as early as the Tang dynasty (618–907). Damasks derive their name from the city of Damascus—in that period a large city active both in trading (as part of the silk road) and in manufacture. Damasks became scarce after the 9th century outside Islamic Spain, but were revived in some places in the 13th century.

The word damask first appeared in records in a Western European language in the mid-14th century in French. By the 14th century, damasks were being woven on draw looms in Italy. From the 14th to 16th century, most damasks were woven in one colour with a glossy warp-faced satin pattern against a duller ground. Two-colour damasks had contrasting colour warps and wefts and polychrome damasks added gold and other metallic threads or additional colours as supplemental brocading wefts. Medieval damasks were usually woven in silk, but weavers also produced wool and linen damasks.

In the 19th century, the invention of the Jacquard loom which was automated with a system of punched cards, made weaving damask faster and cheaper.

Modern usage

Modern damasks are woven on computerized Jacquard looms. Damask weaves are commonly produced in monochromatic (single-colour) weaves in silk, linen or synthetic fibres such as rayon and feature patterns of flowers, fruit and other designs. The long floats of satin-woven warp and weft threads cause soft highlights on the fabric which reflect light differently according to the position of the observer. Damask weaves appear most commonly in table linens and furnishing fabrics, but they are also used for clothing. The damask weave is used extensively throughout the fashion industry due to its versatility and high-quality finish. Damask is usually used for mid-to-high-quality garments, meaning the label tends to have a higher definition and a more “expensive” look.

See also
Diapering (damask patterns in heraldry)

References

Syrian art
Arabic art
Figured fabrics
Damascus